Bidar Institute of Medical Sciences, better and abbreviated as, BRIMS is a district Government Hospital and medical college in Bidar,  Karnataka with a status of autonomous institute under Government of Karnataka. College is recognised by medical council of India and affiliated to Rajiv Gandhi University of Health Sciences Karnataka.

Initially was tagged to district hospital of bidar which was of 300 beds strength and was later upgraded to new BRIMS teaching hospital of 750 beds. The new building has eight stories with various departmental OTs, central lab, upgraded equipments, which was inaugurated in 2017.

The Institution runs UG and PG courses in various specialities. Intake for MBBS was initially 100 annually and had been increased to 150 per annum since 2017. Admissions are through NEET UG.

PG seats are in the department of Anatomy, Physiology, Biochemistry, Pharmacology, Forensic medicine and Community medicine. Seats for clinical departments are expected to start from 2018 onwards in Medicine, Surgery, Ophthal, ENT and Pediatrics. Admissions are through NEET PG.

The institute is tagged with zonal pharmacovigilance centre and NODAL reference lab under NTCP (National Tuberculosis Control Programme).

Campus

1. Main college and administrative office

2. Old hospital building

3. New hospital building

4. Staff quarters (1+1)

5. UG Boys hostel+mess

6. UG girls hostel + mess

7. PG boys hostel

8. PG girls hostel

9. 24*7 Blood bank

The campus is provided with uninterrupted electricity and water on most of the days of the year. UG hostels are attached with mess which provides both VEG and NON-VEG food. Mess is run by a student committee formed from representatives of each batch. Mess expenditures is shared by everyone.

The campus Is free of ragging and a task force of professors had been assigned as antiragging squad to control the same. hostels has TV room, recreational room, etc.

Nehru stadium is just adjacent to the campus. Separate UG and PG hostel buildings of BRIMS with adequate parking place for two and four-wheelers.

Departments
 
Anatomy
Physiology
Biochemistry
Microbiology 
Pharmacology
Forensic Medicine
Pathology
Orthopedics
OBG
Paediatrics
ENT
Surgery
Medicine
Radiology 
Ophthalmology
Dentistry 
Dermatology
Com. Medicine 
Radiology

Gallery

References

External links
 Official site

Medical colleges in Karnataka
Universities and colleges in Bidar district
Educational institutions established in 2013
2013 establishments in Karnataka
Medical colleges in Hyderabad-Karnataka